Callistochroma is a genus of long-horned beetles in the family Cerambycidae. There are about seven described species in Callistochroma.

Species
These seven species belong to the genus Callistochroma:
 Callistochroma cacica (Bates, 1885)
 Callistochroma chrysiptera Eya, 2015
 Callistochroma flavofasciata (Chemsak & Hovore, 2011)
 Callistochroma lampros (Bates, 1885)
 Callistochroma rutilans (Bates, 1869)
 Callistochroma viridipennis (Latreille, 1811)
 Callistochroma viridipurpurea Eya, 2015

References

Further reading

 

Cerambycidae